The Act of oath of six Ingush clans to Russia was a treaty between ten representatives of six major Ingush teips (clans) and the Russian Empire. It was signed on August 22, 1810 in the city of Vladikavkaz. Due to this oath, the Ingush were given the right to settle the land along the right bank of the Terek up to the ridge.

History 
According to historians numerous Ingush clans approached the Russians since the 18th century, petitioning for the integration into the Russian Empire. First diplomatic relationships were achieved in 1770, when 24 elders took the oath to join Russia near the village of Angusht between the 4th and 6th of March. The location of this event, the village Angusht, is the namesake of the Ingush people.

It is worth saying that even after the oath of the Ingush surnames, the former Russian-Ingush relations remained the same. That is, the Ingush introduced resistance against the tsarist government, and in every possible way made uprisings and skirmishes against the Russians. On the side of Shamil's army, the Ingush from the societies of Karabulaks and Galashevtsy also fought.

Involved parties 
General Delpozzo, the commander of the Vladikavkaz fortress, represented the Russian Empire while the influential Ingush clans were represented by ten elders from the six major teips, which were the Targimkhoev, Khamkhoev, Ozdoev, Egiev, Kartoev and Evloev.

Content of the oath 
With the oath, the clans obliged themselves to fulfill several duties. These duties included the task to deploy fully equipped detachments of at least 1000 people to fight the enemies of Russia (mentioned by name are the Chechens), report attacks on fortresses, transfer representatives of hostile groups to the Russian authorities and ensure the unhindered passage of Russian troops through villages. If these obligations were broken, the violater would be declared a traitor and rioter and would be dealt with by the Russian command.

References 

History of Ingushetia
North Caucasus